Thanasi Kokkinakis defeated Arthur Rinderknech in the final, 6–7(6–8), 7–6(7–5), 6–3 to win the men's singles title at the 2022 Adelaide International 2. It was his maiden ATP Tour title, and he won it in his hometown of Adelaide.

This was the second edition of the Adelaide International for 2022.

Seeds
The top four seeds received a bye into the second round.

Draw

Finals

Top half

Bottom half

Qualifying

Seeds

Qualifiers

Lucky losers

Draw

First qualifier

Second qualifier

Third qualifier

Fourth qualifier

References

External links
Main draw
Qualifying draw

Adelaide International 2 - Singles
2022 Singles 2
Adelaide